Egdean (pronounced Egg-deen) is a small village in the Chichester district of West Sussex, England. It lies just off the A283 road 1.7 miles (2.8 km) southeast of Petworth. It is in the civil parish of Petworth.

In earlier centuries a horse fair was held at Egdean. It was one of the last occasions on which the 3rd Earl of Egremont was seen out in public before he died in 1837. The earl gave a £20 prize for the best three-year-old colt or filly.

The Anglican church of St Bartholomew, dating from the 16th century, is in regular use.

References

External links

Villages in West Sussex